Hanna is an unincorporated community and census-designated place in Hanna Township, LaPorte County, Indiana, United States. It had a population of 463 at the 2010 census.

History
Hanna was laid out in 1858. It was named for an Indiana judge with the surname Hanna.

Geography
Hanna is located in southern LaPorte County, in the western part of Hanna Township. U.S. Route 30 (Lincoln Highway) passes through the north side of the community, leading west  to Valparaiso and east  to Plymouth.

Demographics

The population in 2010 was 463.

Arts and culture
Hanna has a branch of the La Porte County Public Library.

References

Census-designated places in LaPorte County, Indiana
Census-designated places in Indiana